Kwong Wing Yan (born 25 July 1984) is a Hongkonger footballer who plays as a forward. She is also a futsal player, and represented Hong Kong internationally in both football and futsal.

International career
Kwong Wing Yan has been capped for Hong Kong at senior level in both football and futsal. In football, she represented Hong Kong at four AFC Women's Asian Cup qualification editions (2008, 2010, 2014 and 2018), two AFC Women's Olympic Qualifying Tournament editions (2012 and 2020) and two EAFF E-1 Football Championship editions (2017 and 2019).

In futsal, Kwong Wing Yan played for Hong Kong at two AFC Women's Futsal Championship editions (2015 and 2018).

International goals

See also
List of Hong Kong women's international footballers

References

1984 births
Living people
Hong Kong women's futsal players
Hong Kong women's footballers
Women's association football forwards
Hong Kong women's international footballers
Footballers at the 2014 Asian Games